Thysbina amata is a species of leaf beetle of Gabon, the Republic of the Congo Democratic Republic of the Congo and Ivory Coast, described by James Thomson in 1858.

References

Eumolpinae
Beetles of Africa
Beetles of the Democratic Republic of the Congo
Insects of Gabon
Insects of West Africa
Insects of the Republic of the Congo
Beetles described in 1858